TDA may refer to:

Finance
 Tax deferred annuity, a type of retirement plan under IRC Section 403(b)
 Time deposit account
 TreasuryDirect account, an account used to buy securities from the US Treasury
 "Treasury Direct Account," a fraud scheme promoted in the redemption movement

Organizations
 Tautinio Darbo Apsaugos Batalionas, auxiliary police unit In Lithuania in 1941
 Team Disney Anaheim, the administrative headquarters of the Disneyland Resort in California
 Télédiffusion d'Algérie, an Algerian public service broadcasting and internet service provider
 Texas Department of Agriculture
 Thomas Deacon Academy, a city academy in Peterborough
 Toa Domestic Airlines, later known as Japan Air System
 Tournament Directors Association, an organization that works to standardize poker tournament rules worldwide
 United States Trade and Development Agency
 Training and Development Agency for Schools in the UK

Television
 The Disney Afternoon, a two-hour television programming block
 Total Drama Action, the second season of Total Drama

Other
 TDA, ISO 639-3 code for the Gadal language
 Taking and driving away, a term for auto theft under Scottish law
 Tamm–Dancoff approximation, a method used in many-body theory
 Temporary duty assignment, a United States Government employee travel assignment
 Toluenediamine
 Topological data analysis
 Tornado detection algorithm, the replacement of the tornado vortex signature (TVS)
 Traditional double action, a style of semi-automatic pistol action, also known as DA/SA